Heavy Metal is an American science fiction and fantasy comics magazine, published beginning in 1977. The magazine is known primarily for its blend of dark fantasy/science fiction, erotica and steampunk comics.

Unlike the traditional American comic books of that time bound by the restrictive Comics Code Authority, Heavy Metal featured explicit content. The magazine started out primarily as a licensed translation of the French science-fantasy magazine Métal hurlant, including work by Enki Bilal, Philippe Caza, Guido Crepax, Philippe Druillet, Jean-Claude Forest, Jean Giraud (a.k.a. Moebius), Chantal Montellier, and Milo Manara.

As cartoonist/publisher Kevin Eastman saw it, Heavy Metal published European art which had not been previously seen in the United States, as well as demonstrating an underground comix sensibility that nonetheless "wasn't as harsh or extreme as some of the underground comix – but . . . definitely intended for an older readership".

Publication history 
After a European trip in 1975 by National Lampoon contributor Tony Hendra expressing interest in European comics, their New York offices attracted significant European comic material. On 2 September 1976 editor Sean Kelly singled out the relatively new French publication Métal hurlant (though Kelly translated it as 'Screaming Metal') and brought it to the attention of president Leonard Mogel on 3 September, as Mogel was departing for Germany and France to jump-start the French edition of National Lampoon. Métal hurlant had debuted in early 1975 from Les Humanoïdes Associés, an association of Philippe Druillet, Jean-Pierre Dionnet, Jean Giraud (Mœbius), and financial director Bernard Farkas formed on 19 December 1974. Upon Mogel's return from Paris on 27 September, he reported that the French publishers had agreed to an English language version, and he suggested the title Heavy Metal for an April issue to be released in March 1977.

Heavy Metal debuted in the US as a glossy, full-color monthly published by HM Communications, Inc., a subsidiary of Twenty First Century Communications, Inc. The cover of the initial April 1977 issue declared itself to be "From the people who bring you the National Lampoon", and the issue primarily featured reprints from Métal hurlant, as well as material from National Lampoon, a colorized portion of  Vaughn Bodē's Sunpot (1971), and an excerpt from  Terry Brooks' The Sword of Shannara (1977). Since the color pages from Métal hurlant had already been shot in France, the budget to reproduce them in the US version was greatly reduced. In late 1979, now only publishing National Lampoon and Heavy Metal, Twenty First Century Communications Inc. was renamed National Lampoon Inc., as reflected in the indicia of the December issue of Heavy Metal.

After running as a monthly for its first nine years up to the December 1985 issue, the magazine dropped to a quarterly schedule (winter, spring, summer, and fall) beginning in 1986, promising an increase in length and to feature only complete (rather than serialized) stories. On 29 December 1988, film producers Daniel Grodnik and Tim Matheson filed with the SEC that their production company, Grodnick/Matheson Co., had acquired voting control of 21.3 percent of National Lampoon Inc. stock and wanted to gain management control. They were named to the company's board in January 1989, and eventually took control of the company by purchasing the ten-percent share of then chairman Matty Simmons, who departed the company. That same month, publication of Heavy Metal increased from a quarterly to a bi-monthly schedule, citing a thirty-percent increase in circulation. A year later, National Lampoon Inc. agreed to be acquired by J2 Communications, a home-video producer and distributor founded by James P. Jimirro, with Grodnik and Matheson staying on to run the new division. In October 1990, the buyout was completed for US$4.7 million.

Kevin Eastman, co-creator of the Teenage Mutant Ninja Turtles, who had grown up reading Heavy Metal, took over publication of the magazine with volume 16 in May 1992, under the name Metal Mammoth, Inc. HM Communications had published 137 issues in 15 volumes from April 1977 to March 1992.

Eastman sold the magazine to digital and music veteran David Boxenbaum and film producer Jeff Krelitz in January 2014. Eastman continued to serve as publisher of the magazine and is a minority investor in the new Heavy Metal, which is now published by Heavy Metal Media, LLC. In 2019, Heavy Metal saw a regime change to CEO Matthew Medney, and Creative Overlord David Erwin (formerly of DC Entertainment).

Artists
Heavy Metals high-quality artwork is notable. Work by international fine artists such as H. R. Giger, Frank Frazetta, and Esteban Maroto have been featured on the covers of various issues. Stefano Tamburini and Tanino Liberatore's RanXerox series debuted in the States. Terrance Lindall's illustrated version of Milton's epic poem Paradise Lost appeared in the magazine in 1980. Many stories were presented as long-running serials, such as those by Richard Corben, Pepe Moreno and Matt Howarth. Illustrators like Luis Royo and Alex Ebel contributed artwork over the course of their careers. An adaptation of the film Alien named Alien: The Illustrated Story, written by Archie Goodwin and drawn by Walter Simonson, was published in the magazine in 1979.

Editors and features 

The founding editors of the American edition of Heavy Metal were Sean Kelly and Valerie Marchant. The founding design director was Peter Kleinman. He created the original Heavy Metal logo design at the request of Mogel and was responsible for the launch and art direction of the first issue. He later hired designer and letterer John Workman, who brought to the magazine a background of experience at DC Comics and other publishers.

After two years, Mogel felt the magazine's lack of text material was a drawback, and in 1979, he replaced Kelly and Marchant with Ted White, highly regarded in the science fiction field for revitalizing Amazing Stories and Fantastic between 1968 and 1978. White, Workman, and Julie Simmons-Lynch, then associate editor, immediately set about revamping the look of Heavy Metal, incorporating more stories and strips by American artists, including Arthur Suydam, Dan Steffan, Howard Cruse and Bernie Wrightson.

White's main solution to the problem of adding substantive text material was a line-up of columns by four authorities in various aspects of popular culture: Lou Stathis wrote about rock music and Jay Kinney dug into underground comics, while Steve Brown reviewed new science fiction novels and Bhob Stewart explored visual media from fantasy films to animation and light shows.

In 1980, Julie Simmons-Lynch took over as editor-in-chief, and her new slant on text material was the showcasing of science fiction by well-known authors such as Robert Silverberg, John Shirley, William Gibson and Harlan Ellison. Heavy Metal gradually evolved into a publication featuring a handful of North American, (as well as international) contributors, such as Richard Corben, Matt Howarth, Stephen R. Bissette, Alex Ebel, John Holmstrom, Paul Kirchner, Terrance Lindall, Gray Morrow, Walt Simonson, Dan Steffan, Jim Steranko, John Shirley, Arthur Suydam, Bernie Wrightson, and Olivia De Berardinis. Later, a review section labeled Dossier, was created by Simmons-Lynch and associate editor Brad Balfour, who came on board to handle text features by authors such as William S. Burroughs and Stephen King. Dossier featured short pieces by a variety of writers, and was edited first by Balfour and then by Lou Stathis, who soon replaced Balfour as an editor. Stathis continued the tradition of focusing on pop culture figures to connect the magazine to the larger hip culture context. There were also interviews with such media figures as Roger Corman, Federico Fellini, John Sayles and John Waters. Simmons-Lynch remained the editor-in-chief until 1993. Kevin Eastman had acquired the magazine the year before and became both publisher and editor after that date.

Comics writer Grant Morrison became editor in chief beginning with the April 2016 issue of the magazine. They now serve as creative advisor.

By issue #298, Tim Seeley became editor in chief. In 2021, Joseph Illidge took over as editor in chief.

In other media

Films

In 1981, an animated feature film was adapted from several of the magazine's serials. Made on a budget of U.S. $9.3 million and under production for three years, Heavy Metal featured animated segments from several different animation houses with each doing a single story segment. Another house animated the frame story which tied all the disparate stories together. Like the magazine, the movie featured a great deal of nudity and graphic violence, though not to the degree seen in the magazine; for example, its Den segment did not display the blatant male genitalia of its print counterpart. The film featured such SCTV talents as John Candy, Eugene Levy, Harold Ramis and Ivan Reitman. It did reasonably well in its theatrical release and soon gained a cult status, partially because of a problem with music copyrights that resulted in a delay of 15 years before the film became officially available on home video. The home video release featured different music in the opening segment (the cause of the initial home video release delay) and included a segment that was not included in the theatrical release.

Another animated feature film called Heavy Metal 2000, with a budget of $15 million, was released in 2000. This direct-to-video release was not based on stories from the magazine but was instead based on The Melting Pot, a graphic novel written by Kevin Eastman and drawn by artist Simon Bisley, who based the appearance of the female protagonist after nude model and B-movie actress Julie Strain, then-wife of Kevin Eastman. Strain later lent her vocal talents to the movie, portraying the character modeled after her likeness.

During 2008 and into 2009, reports circulated that David Fincher and James Cameron would executive produce and, each, direct two of the eight to nine segments of a new animated Heavy Metal feature. Kevin Eastman was to also direct a segment, as well as animator Tim Miller, Zack Snyder, Gore Verbinski and Guillermo del Toro. Paramount Pictures decided to stop funding the film by August 2009 and no distributor or production company has shown interest in the second sequel, since. In 2011, filmmaker Robert Rodriguez purchased the film rights to Heavy Metal and planned to develop a new animated film at the new Quick Draw Studios.

An animated 3D film entitled War of the Worlds: Goliath, created as a sequel to H.G. Wells' The War of the Worlds and based on a story previously published in the magazine, was produced by The Tripod Group and released in Malaysia in 2012.

The series "Interceptor" is being adapted into a film.

In March 2019, the Fincher project was released as a reimagining titled Love, Death & Robots.

In March 2021, Heavy Metal announced their first moves into television with an adaptation of Blake Northcott's trilogy of novels, the "Arena Mode Saga". The first book is in active development after optioning the rights to the sci-fi thriller.

Video games
Heavy Metal 2000 inspired a video game sequel released in 2000, the PC action-adventure Heavy Metal: F.A.K.K.². It was developed by Ritual Entertainment.

In 2001, Capcom released Heavy Metal: Geomatrix, an arcade fighting game that later made its way to Sega's Dreamcast console. Though not based on any specific material from Heavy Metal, it featured character designs by frequent contributor Simon Bisley and a style generally inspired by the magazine.

In 2020, Stern Pinball and the production company Incendium released a pinball machine commemorating the 300th issue of Heavy Metal, featuring Taarna and Cold Dead War (2021). The made to order machine, with a playfield based on the Stern Star Wars release, sold for eight-thousand dollars and shipped in late 2020 along with an exclusive variant cover edition of Heavy Metal issue #300.

Podcast network

In 2021, Heavy Metal launched their podcast network featuring scripted and unscripted shows that focus on horror, fantasy, sci-fi, comedy, and pop-culture. 
 Heavy Metal Magazine: The Podcast: Twice a month, hosts Lea Palmieri and Brendan Columbus critique and celebrate all things Heavy Metal, diving into the current issue of Heavy Metal Magazine.
 I Hate Myself: Hosted by Joe Trohman, co-founder of Fall Out Boy, this unscripted series features in-depth interviews with celebrities, creators, and other "successful-types", discussing how mental health has impacted their lives, coping mechanisms they've learned, and how they're able to thrive while living with depression and anxiety.
 Geoff Boucher's Mindspace: Each week, veteran journalist Geoff Boucher, along with notable stars and creators making guest appearances, talks about reaching a state of Nerdvana with fascinating conversations, never-before-told stories, and trivia about all corners of pop culture.
 WonderWerk: Heavy Metal's graphic audio podcast features immersive sound design and Hollywood quality production in all new mind-bending stories set in the thrilling worlds of science fiction, fantasy and horror.
 Putting The Science In Science Fiction: The series features Aerospace Engineer John Connelly, Columbia Space Center's, Benjamin Dickow and CEO of Heavy Metal Magazine, Matthew Medney as they bring scientists, entertainers and authors on a journey of discovery where fiction and science collide.
 Pumpkin Spice Podcast: "A bite-sized treat where comedy and horror meet". Brittany and Rob watch horror films highlighting fun facts, best kills, cheesiest moments, and the scenes that gave Brittany actual nightmares.
 The TV Show Show: A 90s (and beyond) recap podcast that hilariously looks back at favorite shows with the lens of today.
 Madrigal at the Movies with Rob and Rob: Vanderpump Rules star Peter Madrigal teams up with a director and a producer to talk about the best films of all time.

In June 2020, Heavy Metal began streaming Mathew Klickstein's interview-based, nerd-focused podcast series NERTZ, which has included such special guests as: Diablo Cody, Mark Mothersbaugh, Len Wein, and Alex Winter.

See also
 Airtight Garage
 Den (comics)
 RanXerox
 Epic Illustrated
 Raw magazine

References

External links
 
 Heavy Metal magazine fan page
 

 
1977 comics debuts
1977 establishments in New York (state)
Comics magazines published in the United States
Bimonthly magazines published in the United States
Science fiction magazines published in the United States
Comics adapted into animated films
Comics adapted into video games
Comics by Jean Giraud
Fantasy fiction magazines
Magazines about comics
Magazines established in 1977
Mass media franchises introduced in 1977
Magazines published in New York (state)
Magazines published in Massachusetts